Old Masters are European painters of skill who worked before about 1800.

Old Masters may also refer to:

 Old Masters (novel), a 1985 Austrian novel
 The Old Masters, an album box set series
 Old Masters Gallery, an art gallery in Dresden, Germany
 Old Masters brand of wood stain and finishing products
 Laozi, literally "Old Master", the legendary Chinese sage to whom the Tao Te Ching is attributed
Joe Gans, first African-American World Boxing Champion of the 20th century and Baltimore native